In mathematics, the Nagell–Lutz theorem is a result in the diophantine geometry of elliptic curves, which describes rational torsion points on elliptic curves over the integers.
It is named for Trygve Nagell and Élisabeth Lutz.

Definition of the terms
Suppose that the equation

defines a non-singular cubic curve with integer coefficients a, b, c, and let D be the discriminant of the cubic polynomial on the right side:

Statement of the theorem

If P = (x,y) is a rational point of finite order on C, for the elliptic curve group law, then:
1) x and y are integers
2) either y = 0, in which case P has order two, or else y divides D, which immediately implies that y2 divides D.

Generalizations

The Nagell–Lutz theorem generalizes to arbitrary number fields and more
general cubic equations.  
For curves over the rationals, the
generalization says that, for a nonsingular cubic curve 
whose Weierstrass form

has integer coefficients, any rational point P=(x,y) of finite
order must have integer coordinates, or else have order 2 and
coordinates of the form x=m/4, y=n/8, for m and n integers.

History
The result is named for its two independent discoverers, the Norwegian Trygve Nagell (1895–1988) who published it in 1935, and Élisabeth Lutz (1937).

See also
Mordell–Weil theorem

References

 
 Joseph H. Silverman, John Tate (1994), "Rational Points on Elliptic Curves", Springer, .

Elliptic curves
Theorems in number theory